Hart, Son, Peard & Co. (1842–1913) were British architectural metalworkers based in London and Birmingham, most associated with ecclesiastical works.

Brief overview 
Founded in 1842 in Wych St, off The Strand, by ironmonger Joseph Hart, they became artistic metalworkers specializing in ecclesiastical manufactures after merging with Birmingham-based Peard & Jackson in 1866–67. Also skilled in sculpture, the firm made designs by J.P. Seddon, B.J. Talbert and Alfred Waterhouse. They made silverwork for William Burges, and in the early 1870s for William Butterfield. The company had an agent, Henri Collet, in Paris.

The company were represented at all the major exhibitions, winning many medals, including at: London (1851, 1862); Paris (1855, 1867, 1878); Dublin (1855, 1865); and Philadelphia (1876).

The firm was disestablished shortly before World War I in 1913.

References 

Design companies established in 1842
Design companies disestablished in 1913
Metalworkers
Companies based in the City of Westminster
Manufacturing companies based in London
Ironworks and steelworks in England
Foundries in the United Kingdom
Defunct companies based in London
1842 establishments in England
1913 establishments in England
British companies established in 1842

There are two memorials executed by the firm in Salisbury Cathedral, Wiltshire. Brass Cross on a marble tablet 1890 to Canon Henry Parry Liddon D.D., D.C.L. (1829–1890). Brass memorial on slate to Admiral John Fulford R.N. (1809-1888)

https://www.flickr.com/photos/bolckow/48903485802

https://www.flickr.com/photos/bolckow/48903487442